Black Angel Exit is a limited edition bonus EP given away to those who pre-ordered the Black Angels release Directions to See a Ghost. It was also sold at live shows on the Black Angel's 2008 North American Summer Tour.

"Surf City Revisited" & "Paladin's Last Stand" are otherwise available as bonus tracks on the Directions to See a Ghost 3-LP set, and "Black Angel Exit/Shine" is available as a bonus track via iTunes .

Track listing 

 "Surf City Revisited" - 5:14
 "Paladin's Last Stand" - 3:44
 "No Satisfaction"(Black Mountain cover)- 4:56
 "Black Angel Exit/Shine" - 9:28

The Black Angels (band) albums
2008 EPs
Light in the Attic Records albums